Only Through the Pain is the fourth studio album by American rock band Trapt. It was released on August 5, 2008 through Allen Kovac and Nikki Sixx's label, Eleven Seven Music. It is their last album to feature original guitarist Simon Ormandy before he left the band shortly before the album's release.

The album's first single, "Who's Going Home With You Tonight?" was released ahead of time as downloadable content for the video game series Rock Band on July 1, 2008. The album's second and last single was "Contagious".

The album debuted at number 18 on the US Billboard 200 and number four on the US Top Rock Albums chart. It moved 25,000 copies its first week. As of September 25, 2008, the album has sold 60,895 copies.

Track listing

Personnel

Trapt
 Chris Taylor Brown – lead vocals, rhythm guitar
 Simon Ormandy – lead guitar
 Pete Charell – bass
 Aaron 'Monty' Montgomery – drums

Other
Paul Rayner Brown – photography
Mike Cashin – mixing
Ben Kaplan – engineering, programming
Evan Leake – artwork, design
Adam Malka – composition
Simon Ormandy – engineering
Garth Richardson – production
Scott Ternan – engineering
Josh Wilbur – mixing
James Michael – mixing

References

2008 albums
Albums produced by Garth Richardson
Trapt albums
Eleven Seven Label Group albums